"Tell Me Something I Don't Know" is the debut single performed by Selena Gomez. The song was released as the lead single from Another Cinderella Story soundtrack on August 5, 2008. It went up to No. 58 on US Billboard Hot 100.

A re-recorded version was featured on two of Gomez's albums, Kiss & Tell (2009), with her band Selena Gomez & the Scene, and the compilation album For You (2014).

Chart performance
The song peaked at number 58 on the US Billboard Hot 100 chart, becoming the singer’s first ever entry in the American chart and at 13 on the Australian Hitseekers Singles chart. As of July 2015, the song has sold 1.1 million copies in the United States.

Music video
The music video premiered on MTV's Total Request Live on September 9, 2008 and was directed by Elliott Lester. The video starts with scenes reminiscent of (but not from) the film; Gomez cleaning a house and the maid yelling at her. Gomez then leaves the house and performs a dance routine with her backup dancers, while the maid watches from the house window. The video also features Gomez in front of a black background with lyrics from the song (such as "I'm ready for it" and "One in a million") flying around her.

Accolades

Charts

References

Selena Gomez songs
Selena Gomez & the Scene songs
2008 debut singles
2008 songs
Songs written by Antonina Armato
Songs written for films
A Cinderella Story (film series)
 Music videos directed by Elliott Lester